Rasullabad ( Rasullābād) is a Union council of Nabinagar Upazila of Brahmanbaria District in the Division of Chittagong, Bangladesh.

History of Rasullabad 
Rasullabad is an ancient union. No specific history of this union is known. According to the elderly people of the area, at the end of the English Renaissance period, five villages were formed in the union, with some villages of present-day Satomora and RatanPur. After this, Rasullabad union was formed in 1964 with only five villages: Rasullabad, Uttar Darra, Molla, Lahari and Kalghora.

Population 
The populations of the five villages are:
 Rasullabad – 7,898
 Lahari – 2,602
 Kalghora – 2,971
 Uttar Darra – 1,898
 Molla – 2,011

Markets 
Almost every village of Rasullabad Union has a market. There are total four market in Rasullabad union.

 Rasullabad Bazar – This is the  oldest and biggest market, located in the center of the village of Rasullabad.
 Kalghora Bazar – Not as big, but daily usage products can be found here.
 Uttar Darra Bazar – A small market. Some of daily-use items can be found here.
 Molla Bazar –  A small market. Daily usage products can be found here.

Mosques 

 Rasullabad Jame Masjid
 Rasullabad Madina Jame Masjid
 Rasullabad Uttar Para Jame Masjid
 Rasullabad Maddha Para Jame Masjid
 Rasullabad Dakkhin Para Jame Masjid
 Rasullabad Poshchim Para Jame Masjid
 Kalghora Bazar Jame Masjid
 Kalghora Purbo Para Jame Masjid
 Lohori Jame Masjid
 Molla Jame Masjid
 Uttar Darra Jame Masjid

Eidgah of Rasullabad Union 
There are four Eidgah fields in this union.

Rasullabad Eidgah – This is the  biggest Eidgah open field located in Rasullabad.

Uttar Darra Eidgah – This Eidgah is located in Uttar Darra.

Molla Eidgah – Located in Molla.

Kalghora–Lohori Eidgah – This is a combined Eidgah for two villages, Kalghora and Lohori.

Post Offices and Postal Codes 
The postal code of Rasullabad is 3412.

Education 
There is only two high schools in this union.

High School:

 Rasullabad U. A. Khan High School
 Kalghora High School
Madrasha: There are two Dakhil Madrashas in Rasullabad union.
Rasullabad Dakhil Madrasha
Molla Dakhil Madrasha

Primary schools:

 Rasullabad South Government primary School
 Rasullabad north Government primary School
 Rasullabad West Government primary School
 Rasullabad East Government primary School
 Kalghora Government Primary School
 Molla Government Primary School
 Uttar Darra Government Primary School
 Lohori Government Primary School

References

External links 

Government Website of Rasullabad Union

Chittagong Division
Brahmanbaria District